Persepolis Volleyball Club is an Iranian Volleyball club based in Tehran, Iran.

Honours 
 Iranian Volleyball Super League
Runner Up : 1975–76, 1976–77, 1995–96

 First Division League
Winners : 2004

 Volleyball Hazfi cup
Winners : 1976

External links
 Official website
 Roster

Persepolis F.C.
Iranian volleyball clubs
1963 establishments in Iran
Sports clubs established in 1963